Jan Šulc may refer to:
 Jan Šulc (canoeist)
 Jan Šulc (ice hockey)
 Jan Šulc (footballer)